Gemma Paige Richardson is an English amateur boxer who won gold medals at the 2018 Youth World Championships, and the 2018 and 2019 European Youth Championships.

References

Date of birth missing (living people)
English women boxers
Light-welterweight boxers